Grisch or Greisch means gray in Romansch language and may refer to
Crap Grisch, a mountain in Switzerland
Piz Grisch, a mountain in Switzerland
Piz Grisch (Albula Alps), a mountain in Switzerland
Greisch, a village in Luxembourg
Pol Greisch (born 1930), writer from Luxembourg